Sorghastrum nutans, commonly known as either Indiangrass or yellow Indiangrass, is a North American prairie grass found in the Central United States, the Eastern United States, and Canada, especially in the Great Plains and tallgrass prairies.

Description
Indiangrass is a warm-season perennial bunchgrass. It is intolerant to shade.

It blooms from late summer to early fall, producing branched clusters (panicles) of spikelets. The spikelets are golden-brown during the blooming period, and each contain one perfect floret that has three large, showy yellow stamens and two feather-like stigmas. One of the two glumes at the base of the spikelets is covered in silky white hairs. The flowers are cross-pollinated by the wind.

The branches of pollinated flower clusters bend outwards. At maturity, the seeds fall to the ground. There are about 175,000 seeds per pound.

Ecology
Sorghastrum nutans is prominent in the tallgrass prairie ecosystem and the northern, central, and Flint Hills tall grassland ecoregions, along with big bluestem (Andropogon gerardi), little bluestem (Schizachyrium scoparium) and switchgrass (Panicum virgatum). It is also common in areas of longleaf pine.

It is adapted in the United States from the southern border to Canada and from the eastern seaboard to Montana, Wyoming and Utah.

It regrows with renewed vitality after fires, so controlled burns are used, replacing extirpated large herbivores (i.e. bison), for habitat renewal.

It is a larval host to the pepper-and-salt skipper.

Culture
Indiangrass is the official state grass of both Oklahoma and South Carolina.

The USDA Natural Resources Conservation Service lists the following uses for Indiangrass:
Erosion control
Livestock
Pollinators
Restoration
Wildlife

See also
Shortgrass prairie — Great Plains
Tallgrass prairie

References

External links

 USDA Plants Profile — Sorghastrum nutans (Yellow Indiangrass)
 Missouri Botanical Garden: Sorghastrum nutans — horticultural info.
 Floridata: Yellow Indiangrass
 Blueplanetbiomes.org: Yellow Indiangrass
 

Andropogoneae
Grasses of North America
Bunchgrasses of North America
Warm-season grasses of North America
Grasses of the United States
Grasses of Canada
Native grasses of the Great Plains region
Flora of the United States
Flora of the Canadian Prairies
Flora of the Western United States
Flora of the Eastern United States
Flora of North America
Plants described in 1903
Flora without expected TNC conservation status